The 2022 Shymkent Challenger was a professional tennis tournament played on clay courts. It was the fifth edition of the tournament which was part of the 2022 ATP Challenger Tour. It took place in Shymkent, Kazakhstan between 9 and 14 May 2022.

Singles main-draw entrants

Seeds

 1 Rankings are as of 2 May 2022.

Other entrants
The following players received wildcards into the singles main draw:
  Grigoriy Lomakin
  Aleksandre Metreveli
  Beibit Zhukayev

The following players received entry into the singles main draw using protected rankings:
  Joris De Loore
  Matteo Donati

The following players received entry into the singles main draw as alternates:
  Gabriel Décamps
  Emilio Nava
  Evgenii Tiurnev

The following players received entry from the qualifying draw:
  Yan Bondarevskiy
  Sebastian Fanselow
  Alexandar Lazarov
  Mukund Sasikumar
  Eric Vanshelboim
  Evan Zhu

Champions

Singles

 Emilio Nava def.  Sebastian Fanselow 6–4, 7–6(7–3).

Doubles

 Antoine Bellier /  Gabriel Décamps def.  Sebastian Fanselow /  Kaichi Uchida 7–6(7–3), 6–3.

References

2022 ATP Challenger Tour
2022
2022 in Kazakhstani sport
May 2022 sports events in Asia